Just Mohabbat is an India television series which aired on Sony Entertainment Television channel from 1996 to 2000. The series was directed by Tony and Deeya Singh.

The story revolved around the life of Jai (Harsh Lunia and later Vatsal Sheth), a kid who studies at a boarding school in Dehradun away from his parents, Raj (Salim Shah) and Maya (Kavita Kapoor). The series chronicles his growing up years and focuses on his relationships with his family and friends, specially his friends Madhur, Roma, and Sanjay, and his imaginary friend Gautam (Aditya Kapadia). Vatsal Sheth portrayed the role of Jai in his teen years.

Premise
The show follows the life of a young Jai who is friendly and quiet but enjoys a good time with his closest friends. He is loved and pampered by the house help Desmond who is close to him. Later Jai's long lost Uncle J.D. comes to live with him. The episodes followed a young Jai grow up to be an adolescent experiencing his first crush, first heartbreak and first love all the while trying to make sense of other relationships and friendships in his life.

Cast
Harsh Lunia as young Jai Malhotra
Vatsal Sheth as adolescent Jai Malhotra
Aditya Kapadia as Gautam, Jai's imaginary friend
Chandana Sharma as Aditi, Jai's girlfriend
Jennifer Kotwal as Saloni, Jai and Aditi's friend
Ashok Lokhande as Desmond, the house help who loves Jai as his own son
Saleem Shah as Raj Malhotra, Jai's father
Kavita Kapoor as Maya Malhotra, Jai's mother
Alefia Kapadia as Pia Malhotra, Jai's elder sister
Ravi Baswani as J.D. Uncle
Tanvee Sharma as Madhur Lamba
Karanvir Bohra as Kabir
Manoj Pahwa as Ishwar
Surekha Sikri as Mrs. Pandit
Anita Kanwal as Sumedha
Kunaal Roy Kapur as Sanjay, Ishwar's son and Jai's childhood friend
Yash Tonk as H.S.S
Sadiya Siddiqui as Laila
Irrfan Khan as Mr. Singh

References

External links
 Sony TV page for Just Mohabbat
 

1996 Indian television series debuts
Indian television soap operas
Sony Entertainment Television original programming
2000 Indian television series endings
Indian teen drama television series
Hindi-language television shows
Middle school television series
Television series about teenagers